Charles V. Park Library is the main library of Central Michigan University, named after librarian Charles V. Park. It is located in Mount Pleasant, Michigan. The Clarke Historical Library is located within the library as well.

History

The library was built in 1968 and opened to students in 1969.  The  structure was about three times as large as the former library located in Ronan Hall and cost $4.2 million to erect. As the building of the library was helped by a federal grant, the original cornerstone of the library contained Richard Nixon's inaugural address and a report on the war in Vietnam written by Secretary of State Dean Rusk.

The library was expanded and renovated at a cost of $50 million and reopened to the public in 2002.  Architects for the expansion project were URS, Inc. and Indianapolis-based Woollen, Molzan and Partners.

Global Campus Library Services

The Global Campus Library Services (GCLS) department at Central Michigan University is one of the oldest, continuously running programs of its kind in the United States. Established in 1976 in collaboration with the Central Michigan University Libraries, GCLS delivers a full range of library materials and services to students and instructors associated with the university's off-campus programs. GCLS acts as a link between the resources of the Park Library and more than 7,000 CMU students and faculty engaged at 13 remote campuses across the state of Michigan and more than 40 instructional sites across the United States, Canada, and Mexico. A growing number of online courses are also served by the department. Services offered include reference assistance via telephone, web form, email, and chat software as well as online and face-to-face instructional presentations by GCLS librarians, electronic document delivery of requested materials from CMU's collections and beyond, and assistance obtaining copyright clearance for faculty teaching in off-campus programs.

GCLS provides leadership in the field of distance library services by organizing and hosting a biennial conference devoted to the topic of distance library services. Since 1982, the Distance Library Services Conference has been held as a way promote communication and learning among librarians, educators, and administrators who are committed to providing library services for academic programs offered and students enrolled beyond their campuses and online. Participants discuss, study, demonstrate, and champion the technology, techniques, and theories of distance librarianship. Through published proceedings this information is made available to all who have an interest in this field. This conference has been held in Memphis, Tennessee (2012), Cleveland, Ohio (2010), Salt Lake City, Utah (2008), Savannah, Georgia (2006), Carefree, Arizona (2004); Cincinnati, Ohio (2002); Portland, Oregon (2000); Providence, Rhode Island (1998); San Diego, California (1995); Kansas City, Missouri (1993); Albuquerque, New Mexico (1991); Charleston, South Carolina (1988); Reno, Nevada (1986); Knoxville, Tennessee (1985); and St. Louis, Missouri (1982).

Figures
 306,988 total gross square feet
 1.3 million volume storage capacity
 300 computers with internet access for patron use
  of compact shelving
 2,655 patron seating capacity
 144 seat multimedia auditorium

Michigan Historical Review

The Michigan Historical Review is a peer-reviewed, academic journal of American history published semiannually by the Clarke Historical Library and the History Department at Central Michigan University. It is the only scholarly journal dedicated to Michigan's history.

Sources
 The Libraries of Central Michigan University: Over a Century of Service

References

External links
 Central Michigan University Libraries
 Global Campus Library Services
 CONDOR - CMU Digital Object Repository.
 Clarke Historical Library

University and college academic libraries in the United States
Libraries in Michigan
Central Michigan University
Federal depository libraries
Library buildings completed in 1968